The Minister of Mines was a Minister of the Crown in the Canadian Cabinet responsible for the mining industry in Canada.

The Department of Mines was created by the government of Sir Wilfrid Laurier and assented to on 27 April 1907. The Minister of Inland Revenue was the first to be named Minister of Mines. In 1936, the mines portfolio became part of the Minister of Mines and Resources, in 1950, Minister of Mines and Technical Surveys, in 1966 the Minister of Energy, Mines and Resources, and since 1995 the Minister of Natural Resources.

In 1936, the office of the Minister of Mines, along with those of the Minister of Immigration and Colonization, Minister of the Interior, and Superintendent-General of Indian Affairs, were abolished and the office of Minister of Mines and Resources was created by Statute 1 Edw. VIII, c. 33, proclaimed in force on 1 December 1936.

History
The Department of Mines was created in April 1907 by an Act of Parliament (Statute 6-7 Edw,. VII, c. 29) under the government of Sir Wilfrid Laurier with the responsibility of "map[ping] the forest areas of Canada, and to make and report upon the investigations useful to the preservation of the forest resources of Canada." The Minister of Inland Revenue was the first to be named Minister of Mines.

The Minister of Inland Revenue, the Minister of the Interior, and the Secretary of State were designated to be ex officio the Minister of Mines on 10 October 1911, 30 March 1912, and 10 February 1913, respectively. On 31 December 1919, the Minister of the Interior was designated to be ex officio the Minister of Mines, which would last until 6 August 1930, when the portfolio was transferred to the Minister of Immigration and Colonization. The Minister of Labour took the designation soon after, on 3 February 1932.

In 1936, the office of the Minister of Mines, along with those of the Minister of Immigration and Colonization, Minister of the Interior, and Superintendent-General of Indian Affairs, were abolished and the office of Minister of Mines and Resources was created by Statute 1 Edw. VIII, c. 33, proclaimed in force on 1 December 1936.

From Mines and Resources, the mines portfolio moved to the Minister of Mines and Technical Surveys in 1950; the Minister of Energy, Mines and Resources in 1966; and, since 1995, the portfolio has belonged to the Minister of Natural Resources.

Ministers

References 

Mines
Canada
Mines
Former Canadian federal departments and agencies